Peter Kelly (born March 4, 1991) is an American soccer player.

Career

College and Amateur
Kelly spent his entire college career at Southern Illinois University Edwardsville.  He made a total of 61 appearances for the Cougars, tallying 10 goals and three assists.  In 2012, he was named Second-team All-Missouri Valley Conference and was also named to the MVC All-Tournament team.

Kelly played with FC Tucson of the USL PDL during the 2014 season.

Professional
Kelly signed with USL expansion club Saint Louis FC for the 2015 season.  On June 19, he made his professional debut in a 1–0 defeat to Colorado Springs Switchbacks.

On February 19, 2016, it was announced that Kelly had signed with USL club Arizona United.

References

External links
Saint Louis FC bio
SIU Edwardsville bio

1991 births
Living people
American soccer players
SIU Edwardsville Cougars men's soccer players
FC Tucson players
Saint Louis FC players
Phoenix Rising FC players
Association football midfielders
Soccer players from Missouri
USL League Two players
USL Championship players